The Hay Island is an unpopulated island located close to the south-western coast of Tasmania, Australia.

Fauna
The island is part of the Port Davey Islands Important Bird Area, so identified by BirdLife International because of its importance for breeding seabirds. Recorded breeding seabird and wader species are the short-tailed shearwater (7500 pairs) and fairy prion (1-2000 pairs).

See also

 List of islands of Tasmania

References

Islands of South West Tasmania
Protected areas of Tasmania
Important Bird Areas of Tasmania